Letters to the President is the debut studio album released by Christian pop punk band Hawk Nelson. The album was released on July 13, 2004. It was later re-released on October 4, 2005 with six additional tracks and three exclusive videos.

Track listing

Personnel
Hawk Nelson
Jason Dunn — vocals, rhythm guitar 
Daniel Biro — bass, background vocals
Dave Clark — lead guitar, background vocals
Matt Paige — drums

Additional musicians
Jonathan Dunn — vocals on "Someone Else Before"
Autumn Clark — vocals on "Someone Else Before"
Trevor McNevan — vocals on "Like a Racecar"

Production
Trevor McNevan — producer
Aaron Sprinkle — producer
J.R. McNeely — mixer
Brandon Ebel — executive producer

References

External links
 E-Card

2004 debut albums
Hawk Nelson albums
Tooth & Nail Records albums
Albums produced by Aaron Sprinkle